Nadir Graciete de Fátima Manuel (born 1986) is an Angolan basketball player. At the 2012 Summer Olympics, she competed for the Angola women's national basketball team in the women's event. She is 6 ft 1 inches tall.

References

External links
 

1986 births
Living people
Olympic basketball players of Angola
Basketball players at the 2012 Summer Olympics
Angolan women's basketball players
G.D. Interclube women's basketball players
People from Benguela
Power forwards (basketball)
African Games silver medalists for Angola
African Games medalists in basketball
Competitors at the 2011 All-Africa Games